State Highway 22 in Haryana is meant for Bahadurgarh-Jhajjar-Kosli. It is without dividers and only in cities there is divider. There is no railway crossing between Bahadurgarh-Jhajjar. But when Jhajjar to Kosli there is railway crossing just after crossing the Jhajjar city. Distance of Bahadurgarh-Jhajjar road is 28 km. The total length of State Highway is of 77.61 km.

See also
List of state highways in Haryana

References

 Haryana PWD Site